Yelena Aleksandrovna Posevina (born 13 February 1986) is a Russian former group rhythmic gymnast. She is a two-time Group Olympic champion, who attended Olympic Games on 2004 and 2008. She is a two-time (2003, 2007) World Group All-around champion and a three-time (2003, 2006, 2008) European Group All-around  champion.

Career 
Elena Posevina was a member of the national gymnastics team from 2000. She competed at the 2004 Summer Olympics in Athens where she received a gold medal in the rhythmic group competition. In 2003 and 2007, Posevina won the World Champion title as a member of the Russian group and took European championships group title in 2003, 2006 and 2008. She was named a merited master of sports, holder of the Order of Friendship for major contribution in development of physical culture and sports, high sporting accomplishments, and holder of the Order of Honour for a contribution in development of physical culture and sports.

Posevina also won gold at the 2008 Summer Olympics in Beijing. She is the second group rhythmic gymnast to win two gold medals in the Olympic Games after Natalia Lavrova. Posevina was one of the 50 elite athletes of Russia chosen as an honorary ambassador for the 2013 Summer Universiade in Kazan.

Personal life 
Posevina is a resident of Nizhny Novgorod, Russia and is now working as a rhythmic gymnastics coach. Posevina graduated from the Faculty of Physical Education and Sports of Lobachevsky State University of Nizhni Novgorod in 2013. She has one son named Harry who was born in October 2017.

Detailed Olympic results

References

External links

1986 births
Living people
Russian rhythmic gymnasts
Gymnasts at the 2004 Summer Olympics
Gymnasts at the 2008 Summer Olympics
Olympic gymnasts of Russia
Olympic gold medalists for Russia
Sportspeople from Tula, Russia
Olympic medalists in gymnastics
Medalists at the 2008 Summer Olympics
Medalists at the 2004 Summer Olympics
Medalists at the Rhythmic Gymnastics World Championships
Medalists at the Rhythmic Gymnastics European Championships